The Avery Architectural and Fine Arts Library is a library located in Avery Hall on the Morningside Heights campus of Columbia University in the New York City. It is the largest architecture library in the world. Serving Columbia's Graduate School of Architecture, Planning and Preservation and the Department of Art History and Archaeology, Avery Library collects books and periodicals in architecture, historic preservation, art history, painting, sculpting, graphic arts, decorative arts, city planning, real estate, and archaeology, as well as archival materials primarily documenting 19th- and 20th-century American architects and architecture. The architectural, fine arts, Ware, and archival collections are non-circulating. The Avery-LC Collection, primarily newer print books, does circulate.

History 
Avery Library is named for New York architect Henry Ogden Avery, a friend of William Robert Ware, who was the first professor of architecture at Columbia University in 1881. Soon after Avery's death in 1890, his parents, Samuel Putnam Avery and Mary Ogden Avery, established the library as a memorial to their son. They offered his collection of 2,000 books, mostly in architecture, archaeology, and the decorative arts, many of his original drawings, as well a $30,000 to round out the book collection and to create an endowment. The Library now holds more than 400,000 volumes and receives approximately 900 periodicals, with legacy holdings of approximately 1,900 serial titles.

Collection
Avery Library's collection in architecture literature is among the largest in the world and includes such highlights as the first Western printed book on architecture, De re aedificatoria (1485), by Leone Battista Alberti; Francesco Colonna's Hypnerotomachia Poliphili (1499); works by Giovanni Battista Piranesi; and classics of modernism by Frank Lloyd Wright and Le Corbusier, with the rarest materials held in the library's Classics (Rare Book) Department. In 2012, Avery, in partnership with the Museum of Modern Art, acquired the entire archive of Frank Lloyd Wright.

Art Properties

Art Properties oversees the collection of art and cultural artifacts owned by Columbia University. More than 90% of the collection comes from donations and bequests by alumni, faculty, administrators, and students. Comprising more than 13,000 works of art in all media, displayed in buildings at each campus and held in storage, the art collection reflects all cultures and time periods. Highlights from the collection include: the public outdoor sculpture on all the campuses, including works by Auguste Rodin, Daniel Chester French, Henry Moore, and Clement Meadmore; nearly 2,000 paintings, including hundreds of portraits of Columbia administrators and faculty since the eighteenth century; about 1,000 works of fine art photography from daguerreotypes to contemporary works; the Sackler Collection of over 2,000 Asian art works, including Buddhist sculpture in stone, bronze, and polychrome wood from India, China, Japan, and the Ancient Near East; and hundreds of works on paper (drawings, watercolors, prints) and decorative arts (ceramics, tapestries, furniture) from around the globe. Among the larger collections of works by individual artists are photographs and prints by Andy Warhol and the largest collection of paintings, drawings, and watercolors by Florine Stettheimer (1871–1944).

Classics
Avery Classics is the rare book department of Avery Library. It contains approximately 40,000 printed volumes published over seven centuries, from Leon Battista Alberti’s De re aedificatoria (1485) to the recent limited edition volume, Olafur Eliasson’s Your House (2006). The Classics collection also has important holdings of manuscripts, broadsides, photographs, periodicals, graphic suites—including Giovanni Battista Piranesi’s Carceri (Prisons) and Vedute di Roma (Views of Rome)—and printed ephemera. Notable special collections within Classics include the Trade Catalog Collection, which is one of the largest collections of catalogs of the American building trades anywhere, and the American View Book Collection, which includes books, pamphlets, and brochures that document cities, towns, and buildings throughout the United States. While an appointment is necessary, Avery Classics is open to the general public for research.

Drawings & Archives

Avery's Drawings & Archives department is among the largest and most significant architectural archives in the world. Its holdings include more than two million architectural drawings, photographs, manuscripts, business records, audio-visual recordings, and other related materials, primarily documenting the architectural history New York City and the surrounding region, with significant and wide-ranging examples of American and international architecture relating to the work of New York-based architects and alumni of Columbia's School of Architecture.

Among the notable architects and designers represented in the collection are:

Max Abramovitz
Oscar Bluemner
Gordon Bunshaft
Walker O. Cain
Félix Candela
Carrère and Hastings
Giorgio Cavaglieri
Serge Chermayeff
Ogden Codman, Jr.
Harvey Wiley Corbett
Le Corbusier
Ralph Adams Cram
Alexander Jackson Davis
Delano & Aldrich
Leopold Eidlitz
Wilson Eyre
Abe Feder
Fellheimer & Wagner
Ernest Flagg
Hugh Ferriss
Greene and Greene
Walter Burley Griffin and Marion Mahony Griffin
Bertram Grosvenor Goodhue
Percival Goodman
Ferdinand Gottlieb
Hector Guimard
Charles Coolidge Haight
Wallace K. Harrison
Herts & Tallant
Raymond Hood
Norman Jaffe
John MacLane Johansen 
Philip Johnson
Ely Jacques Kahn
Charles R. Lamb
Thomas W. Lamb
Morris Lapidus
Lee Lawrie
Detlef Lienau
Harold Van Buren Magonigle
McKim, Mead, and White
John J. McNamara
Ludwig Mies van der Rohe
Mayers, Murray & Phillip
Hermann Muthesius
Paul Nelson
Richard Neutra
Carl Pfeiffer
Charles A. Platt
John Russell Pope
James Renwick, Jr.
James Gamble Rogers
 Emery Roth/Emery Roth & Sons
John Calvin Stevens
Gustav Stickley
Russell Sturgis
Louis Sullivan
Edgar Tafel
Martin E. Thompson
Bernard Tschumi
Richard Upjohn
Isaac Ware
Warren & Wetmore
Stanford White
Frederick Clarke Withers
Shadrach Woods
Frank Lloyd Wright
York and Sawyer

The Archives also holds the records of the Empire State Building, Guastavino Fireproof Construction Company, the New York Architectural Terra-Cotta Co., and Woodlawn Cemetery in the Bronx, New York, as well as papers of artist and writer Kenyon Cox, journalist Douglas Haskell, who was editor of Architectural Forum, and drawings by mural and stained glass artist John LaFarge. The department also has major archives of architectural photography, including works by C. D. Arnold, George Cserna, Samuel H. Gottscho, and Joseph W. Molitor. Lastly, the department holds Antonio Lafreri’s "Speculum Romanae Magnificentiae".

Avery Index
Avery Library is also home to the Avery Index to Architectural Periodicals. Begun at Avery in 1934 by Talbot Hamlin, the Index provides citations to articles in approximately 300 current and over 1,000 retrospective architectural and related periodicals, with primary emphasis on architectural design and history as well as archaeology, landscape architecture, interior design, decorative arts, garden history, historic preservation, urban planning and design, real estate development, and environmental studies. The Index also includes a large body of obituaries of architects. Until July 1, 2009, the Getty Information Institute and later GRI co-produced the index. On that date, GRI transferred the database back to Columbia University, which continues to maintain it.

References

External links
Official Website

Columbia University Libraries
Libraries in Manhattan
University and college academic libraries in the United States
Library buildings completed in 1912
1912 establishments in New York City